Highway 26 (AR 26, Ark. 26 and Hwy. 26) is the designation for a state Highway in the U.S. state of Arkansas. The highway is mainly located in Southwest Arkansas and is split into two different sections. The second section of the route starts at Interstate 30 (I-30) just south of Arkadelphia and ends at the ALCOA plant in Gum Springs. AR 26 also has a spur route (designated as Highway 26S or AR 26S), which travels mainly along the corridor of the Clark County Industrial Park in Gum Springs.

Route description

Lockesburg to Arkadelphia 

The route heads east for just under  until it intersects US 278 in the small town of Center Point, which shares a very short concurrency before continuing to head east. Both AR 26 and AR 27 share a concurrency, including through the city of Murfreesboro before both routes split apart just northeast of the city, about  later. From there, the route continues to head east, traveling through the towns of Delight and Antoine.

Gum Springs section 

The western terminus of AR 26 is at I-30 south of Arkadelphia. The route heads southeast for about  before intersecting US 67 in Gum Springs. The route continues heading west for about one more mile (1.6 km) before its eastern terminus ends at the entrance to the ALCOA plant in Gum Springs.

Major intersections

Spur route 

The route runs south to north, where its southern terminus is located at US 67 and its northern terminus is at AR 26. The route is entirely located in the town of Gum Springs.

References

External links

026
Transportation in Howard County, Arkansas
Transportation in Pike County, Arkansas
Transportation in Clark County, Arkansas